The non-marine molluscs of Italy are a part of the molluscan fauna of Italy.

There are number of species of non-marine molluscs living in the wild in Italy.

Freshwater gastropods 

Amnicolidae
 Marstoniopsis insubrica (Küster, 1853)

Bythinellidae
 Bythinella ligurica (Paladilhe, 1867)
 Bythinella opaca (M. von Gallenstein, 1848)
 Bythinella schmidtii (Küster, 1853)

Hydrobiidae
 Alzoniella bergomensis Pezzoli, 2010 - endemic to Italy
 Alzoniella borberensis Bodon & Cianfanelli, 2022 - endemic to Italy
 Alzoniella braccoensis Bodon & Cianfanelli, 2004 - endemic to Italy
 Alzoniella calorensis Cianfanelli & Bodon, 2017 - endemic to Italy
 Alzoniella cervarensis Cianfanelli, Talenti, Nardi & Bodon, 2019 - endemic to Italy
 Alzoniella cornucopia (De Stefani, 1880) - endemic to Italy
 Alzoniella delmastroi Bodon & Cianfanelli, 2004 - endemic to Italy
 Alzoniella fabrianensis (Pezzoli, 1969) - endemic to Italy
 Alzoniella feneriensis Giusti & Bodon, 1984 - endemic to Italy
 Alzoniella finalina Giusti & Bodon, 1984 - endemic to Italy
 Alzoniella isoensis Bodon & Cianfanelli, 2022 - endemic to Italy
 Alzoniella ligustica (Giusti & Bodon, 1981) - endemic to Italy
 Alzoniella lunensis Bodon & Cianfanelli, 2002 - endemic to Italy
 Alzoniella macrostoma Bodon & Cianfanelli, 2002 - endemic to Italy
 Alzoniella manganellii Bodon, Cianfanelli & Talenti, 1997 - endemic to Italy
 Alzoniella microstoma Bodon & Cianfanelli, 2002 - endemic to Italy
 Alzoniella parvula (Giusti & Bodon, 1981) - endemic to Italy
 Alzoniella sigestra Giusti & Bodon, 1984 - endemic to Italy
 Alzoniella tanagrensis Cianfanelli & Bodon, 2017 - endemic to Italy
 Arganiella pescei Giusti & Pezzoli, 1980 - endemic to Italy
 Belgrandia bonelliana De Stefani, 1879
 Belgrandia latina (Settepassi, 1965)
 Belgrandia mariatheresiae Giusti & Pezzoli, 1972 - endemic to Italy
 Belgrandia minuscula (Paulucci, 1881) - endemic to Italy
 Belgrandia stochi (Bodon, Manganelli & Giusti, 1996) - endemic to Italy
 Belgrandia thermalis (Linnaeus, 1767)
 Graziana alpestris (Frauenfeld, 1863)
 Graziana pupula (Westerlund, 1886)
 Hadziella anti Schütt, 1960
 Hadziella deminuta Bole, 1961
 Hadziella ephippiostoma Kuščer, 1932
 Hauffenia subpiscinalis (Kuščer, 1932)
 Hauffenia tellinii (Pollonera, 1898)
 Fissuria globosa Bodon & Cianfanelli, 2022 - endemic to Italy
 Fissuria planospira Bodon, Cianfanelli & Talenti, 1997
 Fissuria sossoi Bodon & Cianfanelli, 2022 - endemic to Italy
 Fissuria varicosa Bodon & Cianfanelli, 2022 - endemic to Italy
 Islamia cianensis Bodon, Manganelli, Sparacio & Giusti, 1995 - endemic to Italy
 Islamia gaiteri Bodon, Manganelli, Sparacio & Giusti, 1995 - endemic to Elba
 Islamia lanzai Bodon & Cianfanelli, 2012 - endemic to Italy
 Islamia pezzoliana Bodon & Cianfanelli, 2012 - endemic to Italy
 Islamia piristoma Bodon & Cianfanelli, 2002 - endemic to Italy
 Islamia pusilla (Piersanti, 1952)
 Islamia ruffoi Bodon & Cianfanelli, 2012 - endemic to Italy
 Islamia selensis Cianfanelli & Bodon, 2017 - endemic to Italy
 Islamia senensis Bodon & Cianfanelli, 2012 - endemic to Italy
 Islamia sulfurea Bodon, Cianfanelli & Montanari 2012 - endemic to Italy
 Istriana mirnae Velkovrh, 1971
 Litthabitella chilodia (Westerlund, 1886)
 Mercuria saharica (Letourneux & Bourguignat, 1887)
 Mercuria similis (Draparnaud, 1805)
 Mercuria zopissa (Paulucci, 1882)
 Orientalina callosa (Paulucci, 1881)
 Pauluccinella minima (Paulucci, 1881)
 Pezzolia radapalladis Bodon & Giusti, 1986 - endemic to Italy
 Phreatica bolei Velkovrh, 1970 - endemic to Italy
 Pseudamnicola conovula (Frauenfeld, 1863)
 Pseudamnicola lucensis (Issel, 1866) - endemic to Italy
 Pseudamnicola moussonii (Calcara, 1841)
 Pseudamnicola sciaccaensis Glöer & Beckmann, 2007 - endemic to Italy
 Pseudavenionia pedemontana Bodon & Giusti, 1982 - endemic to Italy
 Sadleriana fluminensis (Küster, 1853)
 Salenthydrobia ferrerii Wilke, 2003 - endemic to Italy
 Sardohoratia islamoides Manganelli, Bodon, Cianfanelli, Talenti & Giusti, 1998 - endemic to Sardinia
 Sardohoratia sulcata Manganelli, Bodon, Cianfanelli, Talenti & Giusti, 1998 - endemic to Sardinia

Moitessieriidae
 Bythiospeum vallei (Giusti & Pezzoli, 1976) - endemic to Italy
 Iglica concii (Allegretti, 1944) - endemic to Italy
 Iglica forumjuliana (Pollonera, 1887) - endemic to Italy
 Iglica giustii Bodon & Giovannelli, 1995 - endemic to Italy
 Iglica hauffeni (Brusina, 1886) - endemic to Italy
 Iglica pezzolii Boeters, 1971 - endemic to Italy
 Iglica tellinii (Pollonera, 1887) - endemic to Italy
 Iglica vobarnensis (Pezzoli & Toffoletto, 1968) - endemic to Italy
 Moitessieria massoti Bourguignat, 1864
 Moitessieria simoniana (Saint-Simon, 1848)
 Paladilhiopsis robiciana (Clessin, 1882)
 Paladilhiopsis virei (Locard, 1903)
 Sardopaladilhia plagigeyerica Manganelli, Bodon, Cianfanelli, Talenti & Giusti, 1998 - endemic to Sardinia

Tateidae
 Potamopyrgus antipodarum (Gray, 1843)

Melanopsidae
 Melanopsis etrusca Brot, 1862

Land gastropods 

Pomatiidae
 Pomatias elegans (O. F. Müller, 1774)

Aciculidae
 Acicula beneckei (Andreae, 1883) - endemic to Italy
 Acicula benoiti (Bourguignat, 1864) - endemic to Sicily
 Acicula disjuncta Boeters, Gittenberger & Subai, 1989
 Acicula giglioi Reitano, Nardi, Liberto, Sanfilippo, Di Franco, Viviano & Sparacio, 2022 - endemic to Sicily
 Acicula giglioi giglioi Reitano, Nardi, Liberto, Sanfilippo, Di Franco, Viviano & Sparacio, 2022 - endemic to Sicily
 Acicula giglioi peloritana Reitano, Nardi, Liberto, Sanfilippo, Di Franco, Viviano & Sparacio, 2022 - endemic to Sicily
 Acicula hierae Liberto, Reitano, Viviano & Sparacio, 2020 - endemic to Marettimo Island
 Acicula lineata sublineata (Andreae, 1883)
 Acicula lineolata (Pini, 1884)
 Acicula lineolata lineolata (Pini, 1884)
 Acicula lineolata banki Boeters, Gittenberger & Subai, 1989
 Acicula szigethyannae Subai, 1977
 Acicula vezzanii Bodon, 1994
 Platyla curtii (Wagner, 1912)
 Platyla foliniana (Nevill, 1879)
 Platyla gracilis (Clessin, 1877)
 Platyla microspira (Pini, 1884)
 Platyla pezzolii Boeters, Gittenberger & Subai, 1989 - endemic to Italy
 Platyla polita (Hartmann, 1840)
 Platyla polita polita (Hartmann, 1840)
 Platyla polita regina (Subai, 1977) - endemic to Italy
 Platyla sardoa Cianfanelli, Talenti, Bodon & Manganelli, 2000 - endemic to Sardinia
 Platyla similis (Reinhardt, 1880)
 Platyla stussinieri (Boettger, 1884)
 Platyla subdiaphana (Bivona, 1839) - endemic to Sicily
 Platyla talentii Bodon & Cianfanelli, 2008 - endemic to Italy
 Renea berica Niero, Nardi & Braccia, 2012 - endemic to Italy
 Renea bourguignatiana Nevill, 1880
 Renea elegantissima (Pini, 1886)
 Renea gentilei (Pollonera, 1889) - endemic to Italy
 Renea spectabilis (Rossmässler, 1839)
 Renea veneta (Pirona, 1865)

Cochlostomatidae
 Cochlostoma affine (Benoit, 1876) - endemic to Sicily
 Cochlostoma alleryanum (Paulucci, 1879) - endemic to Sicily
 Cochlostoma canestrinii (Adami, 1876) - endemic to Italy
 Cochlostoma crosseanum (Paulucci, 1879) - endemic to Italy
 Cochlostoma crosseanum agriotes (Westerlund, 1879) - endemic to Italy
 Cochlostoma crosseanum crosseanum (Paulucci, 1879) - endemic to Italy
 Cochlostoma gracile (L. Pfeiffer, 1849)
 Cochlostoma henricae (Strobel, 1851)
 Cochlostoma henricae henricae (Strobel, 1851)
 Cochlostoma henricae lissogyrus (Westerlund, 1881) - endemic to Italy
 Cochlostoma henricae strigillatum (A. J. Wagner, 1897) - endemic to Italy
 Cochlostoma mariannae H. Nordsieck, 2011 - endemic to Italy
 Cochlostoma montanum (Issel, 1866) - endemic to Italy
 Cochlostoma montanum cassiniacum (Saint-Simon, 1878) - endemic to Italy
 Cochlostoma montanum montanum (Issel, 1866) - endemic to Italy
 Cochlostoma paladilhianum (Saint-Simon, 1869) - endemic to Sicily
 Cochlostoma philippianum (Gredler, 1853)
 Cochlostoma porroi (Strobel, 1850) - endemic to Italy
Cochlostoma porroi gredleri (Westerlund, 1879) - endemic to Italy
Cochlostoma porroi porroi (Strobel, 1850) - endemic to Italy
Cochlostoma porroi stabilei (Pini, 1885) - endemic to Italy
 Cochlostoma sardoum (Westerlund, 1890) - endemic to Sardinia
 Cochlostoma scalarinum (A. Villa & G. B. Villa, 1841)
 Cochlostoma septemspirale septemspirale (Razoumowsky, 1789)
 Cochlostoma simrothi (Caziot, 1908)
 Cochlostoma stelucarum Zallot, De Mattia, Fehér & Gittenberger, 2021
 Cochlostoma subalpinum (Pini, 1885)
 Cochlostoma tergestinum (Westerlund, 1878)
 Cochlostoma villae (Strobel, 1851)
 Cochlostoma westerlundi (Paulucci, 1879) - endemic to Italy
 Cochlostoma westerlundi dionysi (Paulucci, 1879) - endemic to Sicily
 Cochlostoma westerlundi westerlundi (Paulucci, 1879) - endemic to Italy
 Cochlostoma westerlundi yapigium (Westerlund, 1885) - endemic to Italy
 Striolata striolata (Porro, 1840) - endemic to Italy

Cochlicopidae
 Cochlicopa lubrica (O. F. Müller, 1774)
 Cochlicopa lubricella (Porro, 1838)

Azecidae
 Gomeziella girottii (Esu, 1978) - endemic to Sardinia
 Gomphroa bisacchii (Giusti, 1970) - endemic to Sardinia
 Gomphroa cylindracea (Calcara, 1840) - endemic to Sicily
 Gomphroa dohrni (Paulucci, 1882) - endemic to Sardinia
 Gomphroa emiliana (Bourguignat, 1859) - endemic to Marettimo Island
 Gomphroa etrusca (Paulucci, 1886) - endemic to Italy
 Gomphroa incerta (Bourguignat, 1859) - endemic to the Aeolian Islands
 Hypnocarnica micaelae Cianfanelli & Bodon, 2018 - endemic to Italy

Chondrinidae
 Abida secale secale (Draparnaud, 1801)
 Chondrina arcadica clienta (Westerlund, 1883)
 Chondrina avenacea (Bruguière, 1792)
 Chondrina avenacea avenacea (Bruguière, 1792)
 Chondrina avenacea istriana Ehrmann, 1931
 Chondrina avenacea latilabris (Stossich, 1895) - endemic to Italy
 Chondrina avenacea lepta (Westerlund, 1887)
 Chondrina avenacea lessinica (Adami, 1885) - endemic to Italy
 Chondrina avenacea veneta H. Nordsieck, 1962 - endemic to Italy
 Chondrina bergomensis (Küster, 1850) - endemic to Italy
 Chondrina feneriensis Bodon, Nardi, Cianfanelli & Kokshoorn, 2015 - endemic to Italy
 Chondrina generosensis H. Nordsieck, 1962
 Chondrina megacheilos (De Cristofori & Jan, 1832)
 Chondrina megacheilos avenoides (Westerlund, 1874) - endemic to Italy
 Chondrina megacheilos caziotana Pilsbry, 1918 - endemic to Italy
 Chondrina megacheilos frassineiana Nardi, 2009 - endemic to Italy
 Chondrina megacheilos megacheilos (De Cristofori & Jan, 1832)
 Chondrina megacheilos toscolana (Schröder, 1913) - endemic to Italy
 Chondrina multidentata (Strobel, 1851) - endemic to Italy
 Chondrina multidentata gredleriana (Clessin, 1887 - endemic to Italy
 Chondrina multidentata multidentata (Strobel, 1851) - endemic to Italy
 Chondrina multidentata schista (Westerlund, 1887) - endemic to Italy
 Chondrina oligodonta (Del Prete, 1879) - endemic to Italy
 Granaria frumentum (Draparnaud, 1801)
 Granaria frumentum apennina (Küster, 1847) - endemic to Italy
 Granaria frumentum frumentum (Draparnaud, 1801)
 Granaria frumentum illyrica (Rossmässler, 1835)
 Granaria stabilei (E. von Martens, 1865)
 Granopupa granum (Draparnaud, 1801)
 Rupestrella homala (Westerlund, 1892) - endemic to Sicily
 Rupestrella homala falkneri Beckmann, 2002 - endemic to Sicily
 Rupestrella homala homala (Westerlund, 1892) - endemic to Sicily
 Rupestrella homala massae Beckmann, 2002 - endemic to Sicily
 Rupestrella occulta (Rossmässler, 1839) - endemic to Sicily
 Rupestrella occulta gibilfunnensis (De Gregorio, 1895) - endemic to Sicily
 Rupestrella occulta occulta (Rossmässler, 1839) - endemic to Sicily
 Rupestrella philippii (Cantraine, 1840)
 Rupestrella rupestris (Philippi, 1836)
 Rupestrella rupestris carolae Beckmann, 2002 - endemic to Sicily
 Rupestrella rupestris lamellosa Beckmann, 2002 - endemic to Sicily
 Rupestrella rupestris margritae Beckmann, 2002 - endemic to Sicily
 Rupestrella rupestris rupestris (Philippi, 1836)
 Solatopupa guidoni (Caziot, 1904)
 Solatopupa juliana (Issel, 1866) - endemic to Italy
 Solatopupa pallida (Rossmässler, 1842) - endemic to Italy
 Solatopupa psarolena (Bourguignat, 1858)
 Solatopupa similis (Bruguière, 1792)

Lauriidae
 Lauria cylindracea (Da Costa, 1778)

Valloniidae
 Plagyrona angusta D.T. Holyoak & G.A. Holyoak, 2012
 Plagyrona placida (Shuttleworth, 1852)
 Vallonia costata (O. F. Müller, 1774)
 Vallonia enniensis (Gredler, 1856)
 Vallonia excentrica Sterki, 1893
 Vallonia pulchella (O.F. Müller, 1774)
 Vallonia suevica Geyer, 1908

Truncatellinidae
 Truncatellina cylindrica (Férussac, 1807)

Vertiginidae
 Vertigo alpestris Alder, 1838
 Vertigo angustior Jeffreys, 1830
 Vertigo antivertigo (Draparnaud, 1801)
 Vertigo genesii (Gredler, 1856)
 Vertigo geyeri Lindholm, 1925
 Vertigo moulinsiana (Dupuy, 1849)
 Vertigo pusilla O. F. Müller, 1774
 Vertigo pygmaea (Draparnaud, 1801)

Clausiliidae
 Alinda biplicata biplicata (Montagu, 1803)
 Balea perversa (Linnaeus, 1758)
 Bulgarica thessalonica (Rossmässler, 1839)
 Charpentieria dyodon (S. Studer, 1820)
 Charpentieria dyodon alpina (Stabile, 1859) - endemic to Italy
 Charpentieria dyodon dyodon (S. Studer, 1820)
 Charpentieria dyodon paulucciana (Pollonera, 1885) - endemic to Italy
 Charpentieria dyodon thomasiana (Küster, 1850) - endemic to Italy
 Charpentieria itala (G. von Martens, 1824)
 Charpentieria itala albopustulata (De Cristofori & Jan, 1832) - endemic to Italy
 Charpentieria itala allatollae (Käufel, 1928) - endemic to Italy
 Charpentieria itala baldensis (Charpentier, 1852) - endemic to Italy
 Charpentieria itala balsamoi (Strobel, 1850) - endemic to Italy
 Charpentieria itala braunii (Rossmässler, 1836)
 Charpentieria itala clavata (Rossmässler, 1836) - endemic to Italy
 Charpentieria itala itala (G. v. Martens, 1824) - endemic to Italy
 Charpentieria itala latestriata (Küster, 1850) - endemic to Italy
 Charpentieria itala leccoensis (Saint-Simon, 1848)
 Charpentieria itala lorinae (Gredler, 1869) - endemic to Italy
 Charpentieria itala punctata (Michaud, 1831)
 Charpentieria itala rubiginea (Rossmässler, 1836) - endemic to Italy
 Charpentieria itala serravalensis (H. Nordsieck, 1963) - endemic to Italy
 Charpentieria itala tiesenhauseni (Gredler, 1885) - endemic to Italy
 Charpentieria itala trepida (Käufel, 1928) - endemic to Italy
 Charpentieria itala triumplinae Nardi, 2011 - endemic to Italy
 Charpentieria itala variscoi (Pini, 1883) - endemic to Italy
 Charpentieria itala zalloti De Mattia, Reier & Haring, 2021 - endemic to Italy
 Charpentieria stenzii (Rossmässler, 1836)
 Charpentieria stenzii butoti Bank, 1987 - endemic to Italy
 Charpentieria stenzii cincta (Brumati, 1838)
 Charpentieria stenzii faueri Bank, 1987 - endemic to Italy
 Charpentieria stenzii letochana (Gredler, 1874) - endemic to Italy
 Charpentieria stenzii nordsiecki Fauer, 1991 - endemic to Italy
 Charpentieria stenzii paroliniana (De Betta & Martinati, 1855) - endemic to Italy
 Charpentieria stenzii stenzii (Rossmässler, 1836) - endemic to Italy
 Charpentieria stenzii westerlundi H. Nordsieck, 1993 - endemic to Italy
 Clausilia cruciata cruciata (Studer, 1820)
 Clausilia dubia Draparnaud, 1805
 Clausilia brembina Strobel, 1850 - endemic to Italy
 Clausilia brembina alanica H. Nordsieck, 2013 - endemic to Italy
 Clausilia brembina brembina Strobel, 1850 - endemic to Italy
 Clausilia brembina gardonensis Nardi & H. Nordsieck, 2013 - endemic to Italy
 Clausilia brembina klemmi H. Nordsieck, 1966 - endemic to Italy
 Clausilia brembina umbrosa (Käufel, 1928) - endemic to Italy
 Clausilia whateliana Charpentier, 1850 - endemic to Italy
 Clausilia whateliana exoptata A. Schmidt, 1856 - endemic to Italy
 Clausilia whateliana whateliana Charpentier, 1850 - endemic to Italy
 Clausilia umbrosella Nordsieck, 1993 - endemic to Italy
 Cochlodina bidens (Linnaeus, 1758)
 Cochlodina comensis (L. Pfeiffer, 1850)
 Cochlodina comensis comensis (L. Pfeiffer, 1850)
 Cochlodina comensis lucensis (Gentiluomo, 1868)
 Cochlodina comensis trilamellata (A. Schmidt, 1868)
 Cochlodina costata (Pfeiffer, 1828)
 Cochlodina costata curta (Rossmässler, 1836)
 Cochlodina costata fusca (De Betta, 1852)
 Cochlodina costata natisonensis H. Nordsieck, 2007
 Cochlodina costata psila (Westerlund, 1884)
 Cochlodina costata ungulata (Rossmässler, 1835)
 Cochlodina dubiosa dubiosa (Clessin, 1882)
 Cochlodina fimbriata fimbriata (Rossmässler, 1835)
 Cochlodina laminata (Montagu, 1803)
 Cochlodina laminata grossa (Rossmässler, 1835)
 Cochlodina laminata laminata (Montagu, 1803)
 Cochlodina kuesteri (Rossmässler, 1836) - endemic to Sardinia
 Cochlodina kuesteri kuesteri (Rossmässler, 1836) - endemic to Sardinia
 Cochlodina kuesteri sassariensis H. Nordsieck, 1969 - endemic to Sardinia
 Cochlodina orthostoma orthostoma (Menke, 1828)
 Cochlodina triloba (O. Boettger, 1877)
 Delima bilabiata biasolettiana (Charpentier, 1852)
 Dilataria boettgeriana (Paulucci, 1878) - endemic to Italy
 Dilataria succineata (Rossmässler, 1836)
 Erjavecia bergeri (Rossmässler, 1836)
 Fusulus interruptus (C. Pfeiffer, 1828)
 Gibbularia gibbula (Rossmässler, 1836)
 Gibbularia gibbula gibbula (Rossmässler, 1836)
 Gibbularia gibbula honii (Tiberi, 1878) - endemic to Italy
 Gibbularia gibbula multiplex (Westerlund, 1884) - endemic to Italy
 Gibbularia gibbula niethammeri (B. Rensch, 1934) - endemic to Italy
 Gibbularia gibbula sanctangeli (A. J. Wagner, 1925) - endemic to Italy
 Gibbularia gibbula selecta (Monterosato, 1908) - endemic to Italy
 Julica schmidtii schmidtii (L. Pfeiffer, 1841)
 Laciniaria plicata plicata (Draparnaud, 1801)
 Lampedusa lopadusae (Calcara, 1846) - endemic to Italy
 Lampedusa lopadusae lopadusae (Calcara, 1846) - endemic to Lampedusa Island
 Lampedusa lopadusae nodulosa (Monterosato, 1892) - endemic to Lampione Island
 Leucostigma candidescens (Rossmässler, 1835) - endemic to Italy
 Leucostigma candidescens candidescens (Rossmässler, 1835) - endemic to Italy
 Leucostigma candidescens convertitum (Flach, 1907) - endemic to Italy
 Leucostigma candidescens dextromira H. Nordsieck, 2011 - endemic to Italy
 Leucostigma candidescens leucostigma (Rossmässler, 1836) - endemic to Italy
 Leucostigma candidescens megachilus (Paulucci, 1881) - endemic to Italy
 Leucostigma candidescens monticola H. Nordsieck, 2011 - endemic to Italy
 Leucostigma candidescens opalinum (Rossmässler, 1836) - endemic to Italy
 Leucostigma candidescens paraconvertitum H. Nordsieck, 2011 - endemic to Italy
 Leucostigma candidescens samniticum (Rossmässler, 1842) - endemic to Italy
 Macrogastra asphaltina Rossmässler, 1836
 Macrogastra attenuata (Rossmässler, 1835)
 Macrogastra attenuata attenuata (Rossmässler, 1835)
 Macrogastra attenuata iriana (Pollonera, 1885) - endemic to Italy
 Macrogastra attenuata lineolata (Held, 1836)
 Macrogastra attenuata modulata (A. Schmidt, 1856) - endemic to Italy
 Macrogastra attenuata tenuistriata (Pini, 1879) - endemic to Italy
 Macrogastra badia (C. Pfeiffer, 1828)
 Macrogastra badia alpina H. Nordsieck, 2006
 Macrogastra badia mucida (Rossmässler, 1835)
 Macrogastra mellae mellae (Stabile, 1864)
 Macrogastra plicatula (Draparnaud, 1801)
 Macrogastra plicatula amiatensis H. Nordsieck, 2006 - endemic to Italy
 Macrogastra plicatula apennina (Gentiluomo, 1868) - endemic to Italy
 Macrogastra plicatula aprutica H. Nordsieck, 2006 - endemic to Italy
 Macrogastra plicatula licana (A. J. Wagner, 1912)
 Macrogastra plicatula plicatula (Draparnaud, 1801)
 Macrogastra plicatula superflua (Charpentier, 1852)
 Macrogastra ventricosa ventricosa (Draparnaud, 1801)
 Mauritanica scarificata (L. Pfeiffer, 1856) - endemic to Marretimo Island
 Medora garganensis (A. J. Wagner, 1918) - endemic to Italy
 Medora italiana (Küster, 1847) - endemic to Italy
 Medora italiana italiana (Küster, 1847) - endemic to Italy
 Medora italiana kobelti H. Nordsieck, 1970 - endemic to Italy
 Medora milettiana Giusti, 1967 - endemic to Italy
 Medora pollinensis H. Nordsieck, 2012 - endemic to Italy
 Medora punctulata (Küster, 1850) - endemic to Italy
 Medora punctulata peloritana Reitano, Liberto & Sparacio, 2007 - endemic to Sicily
 Medora punctulata punctulata (Küster, 1850) - endemic to Italy
 Muticaria brancatoi Colomba, Reitano, Liberto, Giglio, Gregorini & Sparacio, 2012
 Muticaria cyclopica Liberto, Reitano, Giglio, Colomba & Sparacio, 2016
 Muticaria neuteboomi Beckmann, 1990
 Muticaria syracusana (Philippi, 1836)
 Neostyriaca corynodes corynodes (Held, 1836)
 Neostyriaca strobel (Strobel, 1850)
 Papillifera papillaris (O. F. Müller, 1774)
 Papillifera papillaris affinis (Philippi, 1836) - endemic to Italy
 Papillifera papillaris papillaris (O. F. Müller, 1774)
 Papillifera papillaris rudicosta (O. Boettger, 1878) - endemic to Sicily
 Papillifera papillaris tinei (Westerlund, 1878) - endemic to Sicily
 Papillifera papillaris transitans (Paulucci, 1878) - endemic to Italy
 Papillifera solida (Draparnaud, 1805) - endemic to Italy
 Papillifera solida caietana (Rossmässler, 1842)
 Papillifera solida deburghiae (Paulucci, 1878) - endemic to Italy
 Papillifera solida diabolina H. Nordsieck, 2013 - endemic to Italy
 Papillifera solida pseudobidens H. Nordsieck, 2013 - endemic to Italy
 Papillifera solida solida (Draparnaud, 1805) - endemic to Italy
 Ruthenica filograna (Rossmässler, 1836)
 Pseudofusulus varians (C. Pfeiffer, 1828)
 Sicania crassicostata (L. Pfeiffer, 1856) - endemic to Sicily
 Sicania eminens (A. Schmidt, 1868) - endemic to Sicily
 Sicania nobilis (L. Pfeiffer, 1848) - endemic to Sicily
 Sicania nobilis nobilis (L. Pfeiffer, 1848) - endemic to Sicily
 Sicania nobilis spezialensis (H. Nordsieck, 1984) - endemic to Sicily
 Siciliaria calcarae (Philippi, 1844) - endemic to Sicily
 Siciliaria calcarae belliemii R. A. Brandt, 1961 - endemic to Sicily
 Siciliaria calcarae borgettensis De Mattia, Reier & Haring, 2021 - endemic to Sicily
 Siciliaria calcarae calcarae (Philippi, 1844) - endemic to Sicily
 Siciliaria calcarae cruenta De Mattia, Reier & Haring, 2021 - endemic to Sicily
 Siciliaria calcarae jatinensis De Mattia, Reier & Haring, 2021 - endemic to Sicily
 Siciliaria calcarae orlandoi Liberto, Reitano, Giglio, Colomba & Sparacio, 2016 - endemic to Sicily
 Siciliaria calcarae parajatinensis De Mattia, Reier & Haring, 2021 - endemic to Sicily
 Siciliaria ferrox R. A. Brandt, 1961 - endemic to Sicily
 Siciliaria grohmanniana (Rossmässler, 1836) - endemic to Sicily
 Siciliaria grohmanniana addaurae De Mattia, Reier & Haring, 2021 - endemic to Sicily
 Siciliaria grohmanniana grohmanniana (Rossmässler, 1836) - endemic to Sicily
 Siciliaria leucophryna (L. Pfeiffer, 1862) - endemic to Sicily
 Siciliaria septemplicata (Philippi, 1836) - endemic to Sicily
 Siciliaria tiberii (A. Schmidt, 1868) - endemic to Sicily
 Siciliaria tiberii alcamoensis De Mattia, Reier & Haring, 2021 - endemic to Sicily
 Siciliaria tiberii armettensis De Mattia, Reier & Haring, 2021 - endemic to Sicily
 Siciliaria tiberii scalettensis (Beckmann, 2004) - endemic to Sicily
 Stigmatica ernae (Fauer, 1978) - endemic to Italy
 Stigmatica incerta (Küster, 1861) - endemic to Italy
 Stigmatica kobeltiana (Küster, 1876) - endemic to Italy
 Stigmatica paestana (Philippi, 1836) - endemic to Italy
 Stigmatica paestana intustructa (Westerlund, 1883) - endemic to Italy
 Stigmatica paestana paestana (Philippi, 1836) - endemic to Italy
 Stigmatica piceata (Rossmässler, 1836) - endemic to Italy
 Stigmatica vulcanica (Benoit, 1860) - endemic to Italy
 Stigmatica vulcanica sigridae (H. Nordsieck, 2013) - endemic to Italy
 Stigmatica vulcanica vulcanica (Benoit, 1860) - endemic to Italy

Achatinidae
 Rumina decollata (Linnaeus, 1758)
 Rumina saharica Pallary, 1901

Discidae
 Discus rotundatus (O. F. Müller, 1774)

Oxychilidae
 Carpathica langi (L. Pfeiffer, 1846)
 Daudebardia brevipes (Draparnaud, 1805)
 Daudebardia rufa (Draparnaud, 1805)
 Mediterranea adamii (Westerlund, 1886) - endemic to Italy
 Mediterranea depressa (Sterki, 1880)
 Mediterranea hydatina (Rossmässler, 1838)
 Mediterranea polygyra (Pollonera, 1885) - endemic to Italy
 Morlina glabra (Rossmässler, 1835)
 Morlina glabra ercica (Benoit, 1859) - endemic to Italy
 Morlina glabra glabra (Rossmässler, 1835)
 Oxychilus alicurensis (Benoit, 1857) - endemic to Alicudi Island
 Oxychilus canini (Benoit, 1843) - endemic to Sicily
 Oxychilus clarus (Held, 1838)
 Oxychilus egadiensis Riedel, 1973 - endemic to Favignana & Levanzo Island
 Oxychilus denatale (L. Pfeiffer, 1856) - endemic to Marettimo Island
 Oxychilus diductus (Westerlund, 1886) - endemic to Lampedusa Island
 Oxychilus draparnaudi (Beck, 1837)
 Oxychilus fuscosus (Rossmässler, 1838)
 Oxychilus gardinii Manganelli, Bodon & Giusti, 1991- endemic to Italy
 Oxychilus lagrecai Giusti, 1973 - endemic to Filicudi Island
 Oxychilus majori (Westerlund, 1886) - endemic to Italy
 Oxychilus meridionalis (Paulucci, 1881) - endemic to Italy
 Oxychilus mortilleti (L. Pfeiffer, 1859)
 Oxychilus nortoni (Calcara, 1843) - endemic to Ustica Island
 Oxychilus oglasicola Giusti, 1968 - endemic to Montecristo Island
 Oxychilus oppressus (Shuttleworth, 1877) - endemic to Sardinia
 Oxychilus paulucciae (De Stefani, 1883) - endemic to Italy
 Oxychilus perspectivus (Kobelt, 1881)
 Oxychilus pilula (Westerlund, 1886) - endemic to Capraia Island
 Oxychilus uziellii (Issel, 1872) - endemic to Italy
 Schistophallus carotii (Paulucci, 1878) - endemic to Italy

Pristilomatidae
 Vitrea botterii (L. Pfeiffer, 1853)
 Vitrea contracta (Westerlund, 1871)
 Vitrea erjaveci (Brusina, 1870)
 Vitrea etrusca (Paulucci, 1878)
 Vitrea garganoensis (Gittenberger & Eikenboom, 2006) - endemic to Italy
 Vitrea minellii L. Pintér & F. Giusti, 1983 - endemic to Italy
 Vitrea pseudotrolli (Pinter, 1983)
 Vitrea subrimata (Reinhardt, 1871)
 Vitrea trolli (A. J. Wagner, 1922)

Gastrodontidae
 Aegopinella cisalpina Riedel, 1983
 Aegopinella forcarti Riedel, 1983
 Aegopinella graziadei (Boeckel, 1940)
 Aegopinella minor (Stabile, 1864)
 Aegopinella nitens (Michaud, 1831)
 Aegopinella pura (Alder, 1830)
 Aegopinella ressmanni (Westerlund, 1883)
 Nesovitrea hammonis (Strøm, 1765)
 Nesovitrea petronella (L. Pfeiffer, 1853)
 Retinella giustii A. Riedel, 1998 - endemic to Italy
 Retinella hiulca (Albers, 1850)
 Retinella olivetorum (Gmelin, 1791) - endemic to Italy
 Retinella olivetorum icterica (Tiberi, 1872) - endemic to Italy
 Retinella olivetorum olivetorum (Gmelin, 1791) - endemic to Italy
 Retinella pseudoaegopinella Giusti, Boato & Bodon, 1986 - endemic to Italy
 Retinella stabilei (Pollonera, 1886) - endemic to Italy
 Zonitoides nitidus (O. F. Müller, 1774)

Zonitidae
 Aegopis gemonensis (A. Férussac, 1832)
 Aegopis italicus (Kobelt, 1876) - endemic to Italy
 Aegopis verticillus (Férussac, 1819)
 Zonites algirus (Linnaeus, 1758)

Spiraxidae
 Poiretia cornea (Brumati, 1838)
 Poiretia dilatata dilatata (Philippi, 1836) - endemic to Italy
 Sardopoiretia emanueli Bodon, Nardi, Braccia & Cianfanelli, 2010 - endemic to Sardinia

Testacellidae
 Testacella bracciai Nardi & Bodon, 2011 - endemic to Italy
 Testacella gestroi Issel, 1873
 Testacella haliotidea Draparnaud, 1801
 Testacella scutulum Sowerby, 1821

Limacidae
 Lehmannia melitensis (Lessona & Pollonera, 1882)
 Limax brandstetteri Falkner, 2008

Milacidae
 Tandonia marinellii Liberto, Giglio, Colomba & Sparacio, 2012 - endemic to Sicily
 Tandonia nigra (C. Pfeiffer, 1894)

Canariellidae
 Schileykiella bodoni Cianfanelli, Manganelli & Giusti, 2004 - endemic to Marettimo Island
 Schileykiella mariarosariae R. Viviano, A. Viviano, Liberto, Reitano & Sparacio, 2019 - endemic to Sicily
 Schileykiella parlatoris (Bivona, 1839) - endemic to Sicily
 Schileykiella reinae (L. Pfeiffer, 1856) - endemic to Sicily
 Tyrrheniellina josephi (Giusti & Manganelli, 1989) - endemic to Sardinia

Geomitridae
 Backeljaia gigaxii (L. Pfeiffer, 1847)
 Candidula cavannae (Paulucci, 1881)
 Candidula conglomeratica Bodon, Cianfanelli, Chueca & Pfenninger, 2020
 Candidula unifasciata (Poiret, 1801)
 Cochlicella acuta (O. F. Müller, 1774)
 Cochlicella barbara (Linnaeus, 1758)
 Cochlicella conoidea (Draparnaud, 1801)
 Cernuella aginnica (Locard, 1882)
 Cernuella amanda (Rossmässler, 1838) - endemic to Sicily
 Cernuella aradasii (Pirajno, 1842) - endemic to Sicily
 Cernuella caruanae (Kobelt, 1888) - endemic to Italy
 Cernuella cisalpina (Rossmässler, 1837)
 Cernuella hydruntina (Kobelt, 1883)
 Cernuella lampedusae (Kobelt, 1890) - endemic to the islands Lampedusa and probably Pantelleria
 Cernuella neglecta (Draparnaud, 1805)
 Cernuella rugosa (Lamarck, 1822) - endemic to Sicily
 Cernuella tineana (Benoit, 1862) - endemic to Sicily
 Cernuella virgata (Da Costa, 1778)
 Cernuellopsis ghisottii Manganelli & Giusti, 1988 - endemic to Italy
 Helicotricha carusoi Giusti, Manganelli & Crisci, 1992 - endemic to the Eolian Islands
 Ichnusomunda sacchii Giusti & Manganelli, 1998 - endemic to Sardinia
 Ichnusomunda usticensis (Calcara, 1842) - endemic to Ustica Island
 Microxeromagna lowei (Potiez & Michaud, 1838)
 Trochoidea caroni (Deshayes, 1832) - endemic to Italy
 Trochoidea cumiae (Calcara, 1847) - endemic to Lampedusa Island
 Trochoidea elegans (Gmelin, 1791)
 Trochoidea pyramidata (Draparnaud, 1805)
 Trochoidea trochoides (Poiret, 1789)
 Xerocrassa geyeri (Soós, 1926)
 Xerocrassa meda (Porro, 1840)
 Xerogyra fiorii (Alzona & Alzona Bisacchi, 1938) - endemic to Italy
 Xerogyra grovesiana (Paulucci, 1881) - endemic to Italy
 Xerogyra spadae (Calcara, 1845) - endemic to Italy
 Xerolenta obvia (Menke, 1828)
 Xeromunda durieui (L. Pfeiffer, 1848)
 Xeropicta derbentina (Krynicki, 1836)
 Xerosecta brachyflagellata De Mattia & Mascia, 2014 - endemic to Sardinia
 Xerosecta cespitum (Draparnaud, 1801)
 Xerosecta contermina (L. Pfeiffer, 1848) - endemic to Italy
 Xerosecta dohrni (Paulucci, 1882) - endemic to Sardinia
 Xerosecta giustii Manganelli & Favelli, 1996 - endemic to Italy
 Xerosecta sandaliotica De Mattia & Mascia, 2014 - endemic to Sardinia
 Xerotricha apicina (Lamarck, 1822)
 Xerotricha conspurcata (Draparnaud, 1801)

Trissexodontidae
 Caracollina lenticula (Férussac, 1821)

Helicidae
 Arianta arbustorum (Linnaeus, 1758)
 Arianta arbustorum arbustorum (Linnaeus, 1758)
 Arianta arbustorum doriae (Paulucci, 1878) - endemic to Italy
 Arianta arbustorum repellini (Reeve, 1852)
 Arianta arbustorum stenzii (Rossmässler, 1835)
 Arianta chamaeleon  (Pfeiffer, 1868) 
 Cantareus apertus (Born, 1778) 
 Caucasotachea vindobonensis   (Férussac, 1821) 
 Causa holosericea (S. Studer, 1820) 
 Cepaea nemoralis (Linnaeus, 1758) 
 Chilostoma cingulatum  (S. Studer, 1820) 
 Chilostoma fontenillii  (Michaud, 1829) 
 Chilostoma frigidum (De Cristofori & Jan, 1832) 
 Chilostoma glaciale (A. Férussac, 1832) 
 Chilostoma millieri (Bourguignat, 1880) 
 Chilostoma zonatum (Studer, 1820) 
 Chilostoma glaciale (Férussac, 1832) 
 Chilostoma achates (Rossmässler, 1835) 
 Chilostoma adelozona (Strobel, 1857) 
 Chilostoma ambrosi (Strobel, 1851)  
 Chilostoma intermedium (Férussac, 1821) 
 Chilostoma illyricum (Stabile, 1864) 
 Cornu aspersum  (O.F. Müller, 1774)
 Cornu cephalaeditana (Giannuzzi-Savelli, Sparacio & Oliva, 1986) - endemic to Sicily
 Cornu mazzullii  (De Cristofori & Jan, 1832) - endemic to Sicily
 Cornu insolida (Monterosato, 1892) - endemic to Sicily
 Eobania vermiculata  (O.F. Müller, 1774)
 Helicigona lapicida (Linnaeus, 1758) 
 Helix cincta  O.F. Müller, 1774
 Helix delpretiana  Paulucci, 1878 
 Helix ligata O.F. Müller, 1774
 Helix lucorum (Linnaeus, 1758) 
 Helix mileti  Kobelt, 1906 
 Helix pomatia (Linnaeus, 1758)
 Helix straminea Briganti, 1825
 Isognomostoma isognomostomos (Schröter, 1784)
 Macularia niciensis (A. Férussac, 1821)
 Macularia sylvatica  (Draparnaud, 1801) 
 Marmorana fuscolabiata  (Rossmässler, 1842) - endemic to Italy
 Marmorana globularis  (Phlippi, 1836) - endemic to Sicily
 Marmorana muralis (O.F. Müller, 1774)
 Marmorana nebrodensis  (Pirajno, 1842) - endemic to Sicily
 Marmorana platychela  (Menke, 1830) - endemic to Sicily
 Marmorana scabriuscula  (Deshayes, 1830) - endemic to Sicily
 Marmorana serpentina (A. Férussac, 1821)
 Marmorana saxetana  (Paulucci, 1886) - endemic to Italy
 Marmorana signata  (Férussac, 1821) - endemic to Italy
 Otala punctata (O.F. Müller, 1774)
 Tacheocampylaea carotii (Paulucci, 1882) 
 Tacheocampylaea tacheoides (Pollonera, 1909) 
 Theba pisana pisana (O.F. Müller, 1774) 
 Tyrrheniberus ridens  (Martens, 1884) - endemic to Sardinia
 Tyrrheniberus sardonius  (Martens, 1884) - endemic to Sardinia
 Tyrrheniberus villicus  (Paulucci, 1882) - endemic to Sardinia

Helicodontidae
 Drepanostoma nautiliforme Porro, 1836 
 Helicodonta angigyra (Rossmässler, 1834)
 Helicodonta obvoluta (O. F. Müller, 1774)
 Falkneria camerani (Lessona, 1880) - endemic to Italy
 Lindholmiola girva (Frivaldszky, 1835)

Hygromiidae
 Ciliellopsis oglasae Giusti & Manganelli, 1990 - endemic to Montecristo Island
 Edentiella leucozona heteromorpha (Westerlund, 1876)
 Monacha cantiana (Montagu, 1803)
 Monacha cartusiana (O.F. Müller, 1774)
 Monacha pantanellii (De Stefani, 1879)
 Monacha parumcincta (Rossmässler, 1834)
 Pseudotrichia rubiginosa (Rossmässler, 1838)
 Tyrrheniella josephi (Giusti & Manganelli, 1989)

Sphincterochilidae
 Sphincterochila candidissima (Draparnaud, 1801)

Freshwater bivalves
 Unio elongatulus C. Pfeiffer, 1825
 Unio mancus Lamarck, 1819

Hothouse aliens 
"Hothouse aliens" in Italy include:

See also
Lists of molluscs of surrounding countries:
 List of non-marine molluscs of France
 List of non-marine molluscs of Switzerland
 List of non-marine molluscs of Austria
 List of non-marine molluscs of Slovenia
 List of non-marine molluscs of Malta

References

External links 
 http://www.faunaitalia.it/checklist/
 http://www.planetposter.de/molluscs/italia.htm
 Pezzoli E. (2010). "Notes on new or rare taxa of Crustaceans and Molluscs from a "fontanile" in Arzago d'Adda, Bergamo, Italy (Crustacea, Mollusca)". Biodiversity Journal 1: 45–55. PDF.

Italy
Molluscs
Italy
Italy